Nimo or NIMO may mean:

 Nimo tube, a historic vacuum tube display
 Nimo language, a language spoken in Papua New Guinea
 Nimo, Ladakh, a village in Ladakh, India
 Nimo, Nigeria, a town in Nigeria

People
Alex Nimo (born 1990), Liberian-born American soccer player
Koo Nimo (born 1934), folk musician of Palm wine music or Highlife music from Ghana

Abbreviations
 NiMo (Niagara Mohawk Power Corporation), an electricity and gas utility company now owned by the London-based National Grid plc
 Niagara Mohawk Building (NiMo Building), the former headquarters of the above
 NIMO (non-interfering multiple output)
 National Incident Management Organization (United States), a seven-member team of professional incident managers with complex incident management as their primary focus

See also
 Nimmo (disambiguation)